In chemistry, pentagonal pyramidal molecular geometry describes the shape of compounds where in six atoms or groups of atoms  or ligands are arranged around a central atom, at the vertices of a pentagonal pyramid. It is one of the few molecular geometries with uneven bond angles.

Examples

References
 
Pentagonal pyramid, Wolfram MathWorld

Molecular geometry